Vincenzo Carabetta (born 7 September 1973) is a French judoka. His brother Bruno Carabetta is also a French international judoka.

Achievements

References

External links 
 Videos at JudoInside.com

1973 births
Living people
French male judoka
Mediterranean Games gold medalists for France
Mediterranean Games medalists in judo
Competitors at the 2001 Mediterranean Games
20th-century French people